The Liberty Flames basketball statistical leaders are individual statistical leaders of the Liberty Flames basketball program, which represents Liberty University in men's basketball as a member of the NCAA Division I ASUN Conference, in various categories, including points, rebounds, assists, steals, and blocks. Within those areas, the lists identify single-game, single-season, and career leaders.

Liberty, originally known as Lynchburg Baptist College, began competing in intercollegiate basketball in 1972 as a member of the National Christian College Athletic Association (NCCAA). In 1975, the same year in which the school changed its name to Liberty Baptist College, it joined the National Association of Intercollegiate Athletics (NAIA). LBC joined the NCAA in 1980 as a Division II member while retaining its NAIA membership; it dropped its NAIA membership in 1983 and adopted its current name in 1985. Liberty moved to Division I in the 1988–89 season. This history is significant because the official recording of statistics began at different times in different organizations, as well as different NCAA divisions. The NAIA record books do not indicate when the organization began officially recording statistics on a national basis, but its current records (as of 2020–21) for single-game and single-season assists were both set in 1972–73, and the career record for blocks dates to 1975. The NCAA has recorded scoring statistics throughout the "modern era" of basketball, which it defines as starting with the 1937–38 season, the first after the center jump after each made field goal was abolished. Individual rebounding was first recorded in 1950–51, as were individual assists. While rebounding has been recorded in every subsequent season, the NCAA stopped recording individual assists after the 1951–52 season. Assists were not reinstated as an official statistic in Division I until the 1983–84 season. Blocks and steals were first recorded in D-I in 1988–89, during Liberty's first season at that level. That season was also the first in which assists were recorded in Division II; blocks and steals were not recorded at that level until 1992–93.

Liberty's record books include players in all named statistics, regardless of whether they were officially recorded by any of the governing bodies in which the school was a member.

Leaders are current as of the end of the 2022–23 regular season. Currently active players are in bold.

Scoring

Rebounds

Assists

Steals

Blocks

References

Lists of college basketball statistical leaders by team
Statistical